The Cleveland Crusaders were a professional ice hockey team from Cleveland. They played in the World Hockey Association from 1972 to 1976. Their home ice was the Cleveland Arena from 1972 to 1974, and the Richfield Coliseum from 1974 to 1976.

The team was owned by Nick Mileti, who had been the founder of the NBA's Cleveland Cavaliers, and also owned Major League Baseball's Cleveland Indians.  He had also owned the nine-time American Hockey League champion Cleveland Barons, but moved them to Jacksonville, Florida to make room for the Crusaders.  The first coach for the Crusaders was Bill Needham, a mainstay of the Barons. Needham coached the Crusaders to winning records in the first two seasons, but failed to advance past the second playoff round. In the 1974–75 season, John Hanna took over as coach, to be replaced mid-season by Jack Vivian. Cleveland finished second in the east division despite a losing record, but fell in the first round of the playoffs. Johnny Wilson led the team for its final season, also losing in the first round of the post-season.

Mileti sold the team to Jay White in 1975, but White sold it back to Mileti in 1976.  However, not long after Mileti closed on his repurchase, the National Hockey League's California Golden Seals moved to Cleveland and became the Cleveland Barons.  Mileti knew he could not hope to compete with an NHL team and decided to move the Crusaders elsewhere.

Initially, the team was going to relocate to South Florida and become the Florida Breakers, going far enough to have a logo designed. After the proposed move fell through,  the Crusaders relocated to St. Paul, Minnesota, becoming the second incarnation of the Minnesota Fighting Saints.

Players

Gary Jarrett was the Crusaders top scorer in their four seasons, playing in 298 games, scoring 104 goals, 119 assists, totalling 223 points. Gerry Pinder played the most games in a Crusader uniform, 304 in total. Other notable Crusaders players included Paul Shmyr (538 penalty minutes in four seasons), netminder Gerry Cheevers (99 wins in four seasons), and defenseman Wayne Hillman.

The last active Crusaders player in major professional hockey was Paul Baxter, who last played the 1986-87 NHL season.

Season-by-season record
Note: GP = Games played, W = Wins, L = Losses, T = Ties, Pts = Points, GF = Goals for, GA = Goals against, PIM = Penalties in minutes

References

External links
 season statistics www.hockeydb.com
 List of NHL players www.legendsofhockey.net

 
Ice hockey teams in Ohio
Ice hockey clubs established in 1972
Ice hockey clubs disestablished in 1976
Crusaders
World Hockey Association teams
1972 establishments in Ohio
1976 disestablishments in Ohio